

Codes 

0–9